The Agrarian History of England and Wales is an academic work, published by Cambridge University Press, which in 8 volumes covers the period from the origins to 1939. Vols. 1, 5 and 7 are each in two parts. Joan Thirsk edited volumes 4 and 5, and was appointed in 1974 general editor of the following volumes (6 to 8).

Volumes

Related works
Chapters from the Agrarian History of England and Wales

Notes and references

History of agriculture in England
History books about agriculture
History books about Wales
Monographic series
History of agriculture in Wales